Abū ʿAbd Allāh Jaʿfar ibn ʿAlī al-Hādī( 226-271 A.H.,  CE –  CE), also known as Ja'far al-Kadhāb in Twelver Shi'ism, was the third son of the tenth Shi'a Imam, Ali al-Hadi. He claimed to be an Imam and established his own sect of followers, to whom he was known as Ja'far al-Zakī.

Family
Jafar b. Ali b. Muḥammad was the son of the tenth Imam, Ali al-Hadi and the brother of eleventh Imam Hasan al-Askari. Also, he had one older brother, Muhammad who died before his father's death.

Challenge

After the death of Ali al-Hadi 
After the death of Ali al-Hadi, Jafar b. Ali claimed Imamate. Twelvers believed that he was immoral. Baháʼís believe that he was a truthful person.

In his defense, his followers claimed that his personality had changed from his youth.  Jafar b. Ali's followers came to be known as the Ja’fariyya and al-Askari's followers were known as the Twelvers.

After the death of Hasan al-Askari 
After the death of Hasan al-Askari, even though, al-Askari's mother was still alive, Jafar requested his property. He claimed that his brother never had a son.

See also
 Ali al-Hadi
 Muhammad al-Mahdi
Sayyid Ali Akbar
 List of extinct Shia sects
 Muhammad ibn Ali al-Hadi
 Muhammadite Shia
 Imamate (Twelver doctrine)
 Ahl Al-Bayt

References 

People from Medina
9th-century imams
Deaths by poisoning
9th-century people from the Abbasid Caliphate
Husaynids
9th-century Arabs
History of Shia Islam